The 1950 New York state election was held on November 7, 1950, to elect the governor, the lieutenant governor, the state comptroller, the attorney general and a U.S. Senator, as well as all members of the New York State Assembly and the New York State Senate.

Nominations
The Socialist Workers state convention met on July 9, and nominated Michael Bartell for Governor; Gladys Barker for Lieutenant Governor; and Joseph Hansen for the U.S. Senate. The petition to nominate candidates was filed on September 5 with the Secretary of State.

The American Labor state convention met on September 6 and nominated John T. McManus for Governor; Dr. Clementina J. Paolone, an obstetrician, for Lieutenant Governor; Michael Jiminez for Comptroller; Frank Scheiner for Attorney General; and Dr. W.E.B. DuBois for the U.S. Senate.

The Republican state convention met on September 7 at Saratoga Springs, New York. They re-nominated Governor Thomas E. Dewey and Attorney General Nathaniel L. Goldstein; and nominated Lieutenant Governor Joe R. Hanley for the U.S. Senate; Comptroller Frank C. Moore for Lieutenant Governor; and State Senator J. Raymond McGovern for Comptroller.

The Democratic state convention met on September 7 at Rochester, New York, and nominated Congressman Walter A. Lynch for Governor; Richard H. Balch for Lieutenant Governor; New York City Treasurer Spencer C. Young for Comptroller; Francis J. D'Amanda for Attorney General; and re-nominated the incumbent U.S. Senator Herbert H. Lehman

The Liberal state convention met on September 6 and 7 at the Statler Hotel in New York City, and endorsed the Democratic nominees Lynch and Lehman, but rejected the other three. However, on September 11, the Liberal State Committee substituted the other three Democratic nominees Balch, Young and D'Amanda on the ticket.

Result
Almost the whole Republican ticket was elected in a landslide. Only the Democratic incumbent U.S. Senator, Ex-Governor Herbert H. Lehman, managed to stay in office.

The incumbents Dewey, Goldstein and Lehman were re-elected.

This was the last election with separate votes for Governor and Lieutenant Governor. An amendment adopted in 1953 required the voters to cast a joint vote for the candidates running for these two offices on any ticket, which has been done since the election of 1954. 

Obs.: 
"Blank, void and scattering" votes: 164,176 (Gov.)
The vote for Governor is used to define ballot access, for automatic access are necessary 50,000 votes.

Notes

Sources
Official Result: DEWEY'S PLURALITY OFFICIALLY 572,668; Canvassers' Tabulation Shows Lehman Defeated Hanley by Margin of 246,960 in NYT on December 15, 1950 (subscription required)
New York Red Book 1951

See also
New York gubernatorial elections
New York state elections

1950
 
New York